The FIBT World Championships 2008 ran February 11–24, 2008 in Altenberg, Germany for the fifth time, having done so in 1991 (bobsleigh), 1994 (skeleton), 1999 (skeleton), and 2000 (men's bobsleigh). It is the first time Altenberg has hosted all of those events at one championship, and also includes the mixed team event (one run each of men's skeleton, women's skeleton, 2-man bobsleigh, and 2-women bobsleigh) that debuted at the 2007 championships. Training for the events took place February 12–14 for two-man and two-woman bobsleigh, and February 19–20 for skeleton and four-man bobsleigh.

Non-competitive events
Practice for men's and women's bobsleigh was cancelled on February 12 to fog and moist air which affected track visibility. Additional training took place on the 13th.

Bobsleigh

Two man
February 16–17, 2008. 30 sleds were scheduled to compete. 26 sleds finished with one team disqualified after the first run, one team not finishing the second run, and two teams not starting after the third run. Lange and Kuske won their third two-man world championship and fifth overall.

Four man
February 23–24, 2008. 24 sleds competed with 20 finishing. Lange swept both events with the fastest times in each heat. It was his second sweep at the FIBT World Championships, having done so in 2003 and his third overall, counting the 2006 Winter Olympics.

Two woman
February 15–16, 2008. 25 sleds were scheduled to compete. 23 sleds actually did with one withdrawing after the first run, one withdrawing after the second run, and two crashing out during the fourth run. This event marks the first ever sweep in the bobsleigh part of the championships' history and only the second time ever in any event in the championships' history with Austria being the first to do so in skeleton at Igls in 1991. Counting the 2006 Winter Olympics in Turin, this is Kiriasis's fourth straight World or Olympic championships in this event. Several crashes occurred the two-day event.

Skeleton

Men
February 21–22, 2008. Bromley is the first British athlete to win a world championship since 1965. Changing ice conditions complicated the sliding, causing five top sliders to leave their starting grooves.

Women
February 22–23, 2008. Huber won her second gold of the while Uhlaender won her second medal of the championships. It was Germany's fourth gold at the championships.

Mixed team
February 18, 2008. Six teams took part in the event. Germany won their second gold medal in these championships.

Medal table

References

2008 in bobsleigh
IBSF World Championships
2008 in skeleton
Sport in Altenberg, Saxony
International sports competitions hosted by Germany
2008 in German sport
Bobsleigh in Germany
2000s in Saxony